In cinematography, full frame refers to the use of the full film gate at maximum width and height for 35 mm film cameras. It is sometimes also referred to as silent aperture, full gate,  or a number of other similar word combinations. It is the original gate size pioneered by William Dickson and Thomas Edison in 1892 and first used in the short film Blacksmithing Scene. Full frame is generally used by all 4-perf films, whether silent, standard 35 (Academy ratio width), or Super 35.   The introduction of Academy ratio in 1932 required that the lens mount needed to be shifted slightly horizontally to re-center the lens at the new center of frame; however, the gate size did not change as the extra negative information would be cropped out by lab processes in post-production. 4-perf Super 35 is nearly identical to the original full frame standard, although the lens mount requires vertical re-centering when common topline extraction is used. Hard mattes for all common ratios exist and either replace the film gate itself or are inserted within it. However, these are usually not used in the event that any reframing needs to be done.

Technical specifications

Standardized by SMPTE.

as per 35 mm film, except:
aspect ratio: 4:3
camera aperture: 0.980" by 0.735"
projection aperture (silent): 0.931" by 0.698"

See also
35mm format
Full-frame digital SLR
Full-frame mirrorless interchangeable-lens camera
Half-frame camera
List of film formats
Silent film
Reframing (filmmaking)

Film and video terminology